In Ohio, State Route 21 may refer to:
Ohio State Route 21, assigned to part of former US 21 by 1971
U.S. Route 21 in Ohio, the only Ohio highway numbered 21 between 1927 and about 1970
Ohio State Route 21 (1923-1927), now US 33 (Pomeroy to Marysville) and SR 31 (Marysville to Findlay)